Giorgi Tskhovrebadze (born 19 February 2001) is a Georgian handball player for Montpellier Handball and the Georgian national team.

References

External links
 Giorgi Tskhovrebadze at European Handball Federation
 Giorgi Tskhovrebadze at Ligue nationale de handball

Living people
2001 births
Montpellier Handball players
Male handball players from Georgia (country)